The 1822 Ohio gubernatorial election was held on October 8, 1822. Incumbent Democratic Governor of Ohio William Medill became governor after the resignation of Reuben Wood to accept a Senate seat, leaving Speaker of the Senate Allen Trimble to act as governor. Former Senator, and 1820 gubernatorial challenger Jeremiah Morrow narrowly beat Trimble and former Ohio Supreme Court Justice William Irvin.

General election

Results

References

1822
Ohio
Gubernatorial
October 1822 events